Fencing at the 2019 South Asian Games will be held in Kathmandu, Nepal from 06 to 9 December 2019. This is for the first time that fencing has been included in the South Asian Games.

Medal summary

Medalists

Men

Women

References

2019 South Asian Games
Events at the 2019 South Asian Games
South Asian Games
Fencing at the South Asian Games